Young Andersen (Danish: Unge Andersen) is a 2005 two-part Danish television serial directed by Rumle Hammerich and co-written by Hammerich and Ulf Stark. It chronicles  the formative boarding school years of fairy tale writer Hans Christian Andersen and his subsequent arrival at Copenhagen where he struggles for success and recognition. It is produced principally by Nordisk Film while additional production funding was provided by SVT and NRK.

Cast
 Simon Dahl Thaulow as Hans Christian Andersen
 Peter Steen as the old Hans Christian Andersen
 Lars Brygmann as Jonas Collin
 Stine Fischer Christensen
 Annemarie Malle Klixbüll
 Søren Bertelsen
 Søren Bertelsen
 Niels Hinrichsen
 Tuva Novotny
 Steen Stig Lommer
 Peter Hesse Overgaard
 Troels II Munk
 Gert Vindahl
 Nina Reventlow
 Mikkel Rosenberg

Awards 
Awards:

References

Danish drama television series
Television series set in the 19th century
2005 drama films
2005 television films
2005 films
Films set in Copenhagen
2000s Danish television series
2005 Danish television series debuts
International Emmy Award for Best TV Movie or Miniseries
Danish drama films
Danish-language television shows